Security descriptors are data structures of security information for securable Windows objects, that is objects that can be identified by a unique name. Security descriptors can be associated with any named objects, including files, folders, shares, registry keys, processes, threads, named pipes, services, job objects and other resources.

Security descriptors contain discretionary access control lists (DACLs) that contain access control entries (ACEs) that grant and deny access to trustees such as users or groups.  They also contain a system access control list (SACLs) that control auditing of object access. ACEs may be explicitly applied to an object or inherited from a parent object.  The order of ACEs in an ACL is important, with access denied ACEs appearing higher in the order than ACEs that grant access.  Security descriptors also contain the object owner.

Mandatory Integrity Control is implemented through a new type of ACE on a security descriptor.

Files and folder permissions can be edited by various tools including Windows Explorer, WMI, command line tools like Cacls, XCacls, ICacls, SubInACL, the freeware Win32 console FILEACL, the free software utility SetACL, and other utilities.  To edit a security descriptor, a user needs WRITE_DAC permissions to the object, a permission that is usually delegated by default to administrators and the object's owner.

Permissions in NTFS
The following table summarizes NTFS permissions and their roles (in individual rows.) The table exposes the following information:

 Permission code: Each access control entry (ACE) specifies its permission with binary code. There are 14 codes (12 in older systems.)
 Meaning: Each permission code has a meaning, depending on whether it is applied to a file or a folder. For example, code 0x01 on file indicates the permission to read the file, while on a folder indicates the permission to list the content of the folder. Knowing the meaning alone, however, is useless. An ACE must also specify to whom the permission applies, and whether that permission is granted or denied.
 Included in: In addition to individual permissions, an ACE can specify special permissions known as "generic access rights." These special permissions are equivalents of a number individual permissions. For example, GENERIC_READ (or GR) is the equivalent of "Read data", "Read attributes", "Read extended attributes", "Read permissions", and "Synchronize". Because it makes sense to ask for these five at the same time, requesting "GENERIC_READ" is more convenient.
 Alias: The two Windows command-line utilities (icacls and cacls) have their own aliases for these permissions.

Most of these permissions are self-explanatory, except the following:

 Renaming a file requires the "Delete" permission.
 File Explorer doesn't show "Synchronize" and always sets it. Multi-threaded apps like File Explorer and Windows Command Prompt need the "Synchronize" permission to be able to work with files and folders.

Footnotes

See also
 
 Information technology security audit
 Authorization
 Computer security
 Information security
 Token (Windows NT architecture)
 Windows SID
 SDDL

References

External links
 CACLS command description on SS64.com
 SetACL SourceForge page

Operating system security
Windows NT architecture
Windows components
Microsoft Windows security technology